Anton Bruckner's Psalm 150, WAB 38, is a setting of Psalm 150 for mixed chorus, soprano soloist and orchestra written in 1892.

History 

Richard Heuberger asked Bruckner for a festive hymn to celebrate the opening of the exposition  on 7 May 1892, but Bruckner did not deliver the piece in time for Heuberger's purpose.

The concert also included a Schubert overture and Liszt's Piano Concerto in E-flat major, followed by Richard Strauss' Wandrers Sturmlied and Mendelssohn's Loreley.

The manuscript, which was dedicated to Wilhelm Ritter von Hartel, is stored in the archive of the Austrian National Library.

Text 
 (Exhortation for praising God)

Setting 
Bruckner's Psalm 150 in C major is scored for  choir and soprano soloist, and orchestra (2 flutes, 2 oboes, 2 clarinets, 2 bassoons, 4 horns, 3 trumpets, 3 trombones (alto, tenor and bass), contrabass tuba, timpani, and strings).

Unlike the other psalm settings composed some 40 years earlier, for which he used a German-language Bible approved by the Catholic Church, Bruckner used this time the German-language Luther Bible for the text.

Festive, strong) as the choir sings "Hallelujah" several times before moving on to the second line of the psalm. At rehearsal letter , marked  (more moving), begins the listing of instruments with which to praise God. Another return to the initial tempo at  marks the beginning of the coda with the words "". The theme of the fugue is related to that of the fugue of Bruckner's fifth symphony and that of the Adagio of his ninth symphony.

The last time Bruckner improvised at the organ, he used melodies from this psalm setting.

Selected discography 
Swoboda's historical performances of Psalms 112 & 150 and Richard Strauss' Wandrers Sturmlied have been recently transferred to CD by Klassic Haus Restorations.

Among the ten other recordings, Hans Roelofs selects the following four recordings:
 Eugen Jochum, Chor der Deutschen Oper Berlin and Berliner Philharmoniker, 1965, LP: DG SLPM 139137/8 (with Symphony No. 7). This recording, which has been transferred to CD as part of the 4-CD box set DG 423 127-2, remains according to Hans Roelofs the reference.
 Daniel Barenboim, Chicago Symphony Orchestra & Chorus, 1979, LP: DG 2707 116. This recording has been transferred to CD: DG 437 250-2 (with Symphony No. 0 and Helgoland). It is more widely available as part of a ten-CD set DG 477 8903 containing Symphonies 0-9, the Te Deum, and Helgoland.
 Matthew Best, Corydon Singers & Orchestra, 1992, CD: Hyperion CDA66599 (with Mass No. 3)
 Helmuth Rilling, Gächinger Kantorei and Bach-Collegium Stuttgart, 1996, CD: Hänssler Classic 98.119 (with Mass No. 2 and the Te Deum)

References

Sources 
 , Anton Bruckner als Kirchenmusiker, Gustav Bosse Verlag, Regensburg, 1927, 
 Anton Bruckner – Sämtliche Werke, Band XX/6: Psalm 150 (1892), Musikwissenschaftlicher Verlag der Internationalen Bruckner-Gesellschaft,  (editor), Vienna, 1964
 Elisabeth Meier, "An 'inner' biography of Bruckner", Bruckner Studies edited by Timothy L. Jackson and Paul Hawkshaw, Cambridge University Press, Cambridge, 1997
 Nicholas Rast, "A checklist of Essays and Reviews by Heinrich Schenker", Music Analysis, 7 no. 2, Blackwell Publishing, 1988
 Derek Watson, Bruckner, J. M. Dent & Sons, London, 1975
 Uwe Harten, Anton Bruckner. Ein Handbuch. Residenz Verlag, Salzburg, 1996. .
 , Anton Bruckner – Leven en Werken, Thot, Bussum (Netherlands), 2012.

External links 
 Psalm 150 C-Dur, WAB 38 Critical discography by Hans Roelofs 
 
 , Stephen Blackwelder with the DePaul Community Chorus and the Oistrach Symphony Orchestra (2012)
 , Donald P. Jenkins with the Colorado Springs Chorale and Philharmonic (2014)

Psalms by Anton Bruckner
Choral compositions
1892 compositions
Music with dedications
Compositions in C major